Haryana, with 22 districts, is a state in the northern region of India and is the nation's eighteenth most populous. The state borders with Punjab and Himachal Pradesh to the north and Rajasthan to the west and south. The river Yamuna defines its eastern border with  Uttar Pradesh. Haryana also surrounds Delhi on three sides, forming the northern, western and southern borders of Delhi. Consequently, a large area of Haryana is included in the National Capital Region. Chandigarh is the capital of Punjab and Haryana jointly.

History
On 1 November 1966 Haryana was constituted as a separate state with seven districts, according to the partition plan of the then East Punjab. The seven districts were Rohtak, Jind, Hisar, Mahendragarh, Gurgaon, Karnal, Ambala. The partition was based on the linguistic demographics and was held after the recommendation of Sardar Hukam Singh—the then Speaker of the Lok Sabha—Parliamentary Committee. A further 15 districts were added later by re-organizing the erstwhile districts. The First Chief minister of Haryana was Pt. Bhagwat Dayal Sharma.

In 2016, Charkhi Dadri district was carved out of the larger Bhiwani.

Administration
A district of Haryana state is an administrative geographical unit, headed by a Deputy Commissioner or District Magistrate, an officer belonging to the Indian Administrative Service. The district magistrate or the deputy commissioner is assisted by a number of officers belonging to Haryana Civil Service and other state services.

A Superintendent of Police, an officer belonging to the Indian Police Service is entrusted with the responsibility of maintaining law and order and related issues of the district. He is assisted by the officers of the Haryana Police Service and other Haryana Police officials.

A Deputy Conservator of Forests, an officer belonging to the Indian Forest Service is responsible for managing the Forests, environment and wild-life related issues of the district. He is assisted by the officers of the Haryana Forest Service and other Haryana Forest officials and Haryana Wild-Life officials.

Sectoral development is looked after by the district head of each development department such as PWD, Health, Education, Agriculture, Animal husbandry, etc. These officers belong to the various State Services.

List
The Government of Haryana has divided Haryana state in the following 22 districts:

See also
List of tehsils of Haryana

References
General

Specific

 
Districts
Haryana